United Artists Records was an American record label founded by Max E. Youngstein of United Artists in 1957 to issue movie soundtracks. The label expanded into other genres, such as easy listening, jazz, pop, and R&B.

History

Genres 
In 1959, United Artists released Forest of the Amazons, a cantata by Brazilian composer Heitor Villa-Lobos adapted from the music he composed for MGM's Green Mansions, with the composer conducting the Symphony of the Air. Brazilian soprano Bidu Sayão was the featured soloist on the unusual recording, which was released on both LP and reel-to-reel tape.

United Artists releases included soundtracks and cover versions from the James Bond movies, It's a Mad, Mad, Mad, Mad World (1963), A Hard Day's Night starring the Beatles (1964), The Greatest Story Ever Told (1965),  A Funny Thing Happened on the Way to the Forum (1966), Fiddler on the Roof (1971), and Man of La Mancha (1972). The soundtrack album of United Artists's West Side Story (1961) was released by Columbia Records, which had also released the Broadway cast album. Also, the American version of the soundtrack album of United Artists's Help! (1965), also starring the Beatles, was released on Capitol Records.

As Henry Mancini was signed to RCA Victor, that company handled the soundtracks of the United Artists films that he composed the music for, most notably The Pink Panther; exceptions include Gaily, Gaily, The Hawaiians, The Pink Panther Strikes Again and Revenge of the Pink Panther. Many of these soundtracks have reverted to Metro-Goldwyn-Mayer, whose MGM Music unit licensed them to other labels for reissue, first Rykodisc, then Universal Music and EMI. As owner of Columbia and RCA Victor, Sony released the West Side Story original cast album and film soundtrack on CD. Sony has owned most of Mancini's soundtrack albums since its music division's merger with BMG in 2004.

The label produced rock and roll and R&B hits from 1959 and into the 1960s by the Clovers, Marv Johnson, the Falcons, the Exciters, Patty Duke, the Delicates, Bobby Goldsboro, Jay and the Americans, and later Manfred Mann and the Easybeats. Berry Gordy placed a number of early Motown acts with United Artists, including Marv Johnson and Eddie Holland in 1959. Jerry Leiber and Mike Stoller were hired to produce artists signed to the label after they left Atlantic. These included the Exciters, Bobby Goldsboro, Jay and the Americans, the Clovers, and Mike Clifford. United Artists covered folk music when it added Gordon Lightfoot to its roster and easy listening with the addition of piano duo Ferrante & Teicher.

United Artists' involvement with jazz was significant. The company hired Alan Douglas in 1960 to run its jazz division.  Other producers were George Wein, Jack Lewis, and Tom Wilson. United Artists released jazz albums by Count Basie,  Art Blakey, Ruby Braff, Betty Carter, Teddy Charles, Kenny Dorham, Mose Allison, Duke Ellington, Art Farmer, Bud Freeman, Curtis Fuller, Benny Golson, Billie Holiday, Milt Jackson, Dave Lambert, Booker Little, Howard McGhee, Gerry Mulligan, Oliver Nelson, Herb Pomeroy, Bill Potts, Zoot Sims, Rex Stewart, Billy Strayhorn, and the Modern Jazz Quartet.

In 1966, the Solid State division was begun, recording several albums by The Thad Jones/Mel Lewis Orchestra. Other subsidiary labels were Unart, Ascot, United Artists Jazz, Musicor (United Artists was half owner of the company from 1960 to 1964 before selling in 1965 Ultra Audio (an audiophile label), and Veep. Unart was created in 1958 and was in operation until 1959, producing singles by vocal groups, then was recreated in 1967 for budget albums.

In 1966 United Artists acquired the masters of Sue Records, an R&B and soul record label in New York City which produced Ike & Tina Turner, Baby Washington, and jazz organist Jimmy McGriff. Some material produced by Sue was reissued on Unart.

United Artists produced a series of children's records under the "Tale Spinners for Children" name throughout the 1960s. These were album-length adaptations of classic fairy tales and children's stories done in an audio drama format.

Other UA labels 
United Artists Special Projects were budget records designed for product and movie tie-ins. Examples are The Incredible World of James Bond, an album sold by Pepsi Cola and Frito Lay of cover version themes and original soundtrack music of the first three James Bond films, and Music from Marlboro Country, various cover versions of the theme to The Magnificent Seven and original soundtrack music from Elmer Bernstein's Return of the Seven that was sold by Philip Morris as a tie-in to its Marlboro cigarette brand.

Merger 

In 1969, United Artists merged with co-owned Liberty Records and its subsidiary, Imperial Records. In 1971, Liberty/UA Records dropped the Liberty name in favor of United Artists.

Mainstream pop acts were signed to the label, among them Traffic, the Spencer Davis Group, Peter Sarstedt, Shirley Bassey, and War. The label attempted to update the style of 1950s rock group Bill Haley & His Comets with a 1968 single. After UA bought Mediarts Records, the roster grew to include Don McLean, Merrilee Rush, Paul Anka, Chris Rea, Dusty Springfield, Bill Conti, Northern Calloway, Johnny Rivers, Ike & Tina Turner, Gerry Rafferty, and Crystal Gayle. Later, through a distribution deal with Jet Records, Electric Light Orchestra was signed. UA also distributed the otherwise-independent Grateful Dead Records in the early-to-mid 1970s.

In England, Andrew Lauder, who had been head of A&R at the UK branch of Liberty Records, transferred to UA when Liberty was shut down in 1971. His signings included the Groundhogs, Aynsley Dunbar (only in the UK), Hawkwind, Bonzo Dog Band, Brinsley Schwarz, Man (all originally Liberty artists), High Tide, Help Yourself, Dr. Feelgood, the Buzzcocks, the Stranglers and 999. He also licensed UK releases for several influential German bands during the early 70s, the best known of which were Can, Neu! and Amon Düül II. Lauder left UA in late 1977 to help found Radar Records.

The label's most commercially successful artist was country artist Kenny Rogers who signed to UA in the mid-1970s, enjoying a long string of hit singles and albums.

In the mid-to-late 1970s the company was known as United Artists Music and Records Group (UAMARG).

Sale to EMI 
In 1978, UA executives Artie Mogull and Jerry Rubinstein bought the record company from Transamerica with a loan from EMI, which took over distribution of the label. The official name of the company was changed to Liberty/United Records, but the United Artists Records name was retained under license. The deal led to an immediate setback, as the change of ownership allowed Jet Records to end its relationship with UA and switch its distribution to CBS Records, with the Jet back catalog transferring to CBS distribution as well. UA dumped many ELO albums into the cutout market, which CBS was unable to prevent. However, CBS reissues of early ELO albums through Out of the Blue (1977) contained copyright notices for United Artists Music and Records Group. Unable to generate enough income to cover the loan, Liberty/United Records was sold to EMI in 1979 for $3 million and assumed liabilities of $32 million.

EMI dropped the United Artists name in 1980 and revived the Liberty label for releases by artists who had been signed to UA. This incarnation of Liberty Records operated between 1980 and about 1986, when it was deactivated and its artists assigned to other EMI labels.

Many albums from the United Artists Records catalog were reissued on Liberty during these years. Two significant exceptions were a couple of Beatles albums not previously controlled by EMI in the United States: the A Hard Day's Night (1964) soundtrack album, and Let It Be (1970). The Let It Be album was actually released by Apple Records in both the UK and the US but because the movie had been distributed by United Artists Pictures, in America the album was distributed by United Artists rather than EMI. Both previously non-EMI Beatles albums were reissued on the Capitol label, which already controlled the rest of the Beatles' catalog in the United States.

UAR today 
When producer Jerry Weintraub was enlisted to revive the United Artists movie studio in 1986, he attempted to revive the United Artists Records label as well. However, only one album was released: the soundtrack for The Karate Kid Part II, a film Weintraub had produced for Columbia Pictures before being hired at UA. A single from the movie's soundtrack, Mancrab's "Fish for Life," was also released on United Artists Records.

The United Artists catalog is controlled by Capitol Records, now part of Universal Music Group (who also owns the non-soundtrack catalog of MGM Records, once owned by UA's current parent Metro-Goldwyn-Mayer). Capitol Records also has the rights to soundtrack albums UA Records released under license from MGM Music. The catalog of most British acts who were signed to the British branch of UA Records is today controlled by the Parlophone unit of Warner Music Group, with North American distribution by Rhino Entertainment. One exception is the band The Vapors, whose rights to their UA/Liberty recordings are owned by RT Industries, which acquired them from WMG in 2018. However, Warner's services division Alternative Distribution Alliance serves as RT's distributor.

Roster 

 999
 A Band Called O
 Morris Albert
 American Flyer
 American Spring
 Amon Düül II
 The Animals (Jet)
 The Angels (Ascot)
 Paul Anka
 B. J. Arnau
 Shirley Bassey
 The Beatles (US and Canada)
 Black Widow (US)
 Brass Construction
 Brinsley Schwarz
 Buzzcocks
 Can
 Al Caiola (Ultra Audio & United Artists)
 Canned Heat
 Anita Carter
 The Clovers
 Odia Coates
 Bill Conti
 Pat Cooper
 Cornelius Brothers & Sister Rose
 Don Costa
 Country Gazette
 Curfew
 The D-Men (Veep & United Artists)
 Chris Darrow
 The Spencer Davis Group (US)
 The Delicates (Unart)
 Dr. Feelgood (UK)
 Patty Duke
 The Easybeats
 The Electric Indian
 Electric Light Orchestra (United Artists & Jet)
 Enchantment (Roadshow Records and United Artists)
 The Exciters
 The Falcons
 Family (US & Canada)
 Ferrante & Teicher (Ultra Audio & United Artists)
 Fischer-Z
 Sergio Franchi
 Connie Francis
 Crystal Gayle
 Bobby Goldsboro
 The Groundhogs
 Bill Haley & His Comets
 The Hassles
 Hawkwind
 Roy Head & the Traits (Ascot)
 Help Yourself
 LeRoy Holmes
 The Highwaymen
 Dee D. Jackson
 Jan and Dean
 Jay and the Americans
 Marv Johnson
 George Jones
 Artie Kaplan
 Deke Leonard's Iceberg
 Gordon Lightfoot
 Little Anthony and the Imperials (DCP, Veep & UA)
 Don McLean
 Sylvia McNeill
 Man
 Manfred Mann (Ascot & United Artists)
 Country Johnny Mathis
 Nathaniel Mayer
 Bobbi Martin
 George Martin
 Garnet Mimms
 Melba Montgomery
 Ennio Morricone
 Mouth & MacNeal
 The Move
 Neu! (UK)
 Maxine Nightingale
 Nitty Gritty Dirt Band (Liberty & United Artists)
 Passengers
 Joyce Paul
 Gene Pitney (Musicor)
 The Platters (Musicor)
 Popol Vuh (rest of the world)
 Mark Radice
 Gerry Rafferty
 Chris Rea
 Sharon Redd
 Del Reeves
 Waldo de los Rios
 Johnny Rivers
 Tito Rodríguez (United Artists Latino)
 Kenny Rogers
 Jimmy Roselli
 Merrilee Rush
 Jean Shepard
 Dusty Springfield (US)
 The Stranglers (except in US)
 Donna Summer
 The Tammys
 Traffic (US)
 Ike & Tina Turner
 The Vapors
 The Ventures
 War (Far Out Productions)
 Doc Watson
 Wess and the Airedales
 Dottie West
 Whitesnake
 David Wiffen
 Bobby Womack
 Roy Wood
 Wynder K. Frog
 Frank Zappa (200 Motels soundtrack only)

See also 
 Liberty Records
 Blue Note Records
 Jet Records
 List of record labels

References 

 
Jazz record labels
Pop record labels
Soundtrack record labels
Record labels based in California
Defunct record labels of the United States
Defunct companies based in Greater Los Angeles
EMI
Record labels established in 1957
Record labels disestablished in 1980
1957 establishments in California
1980 disestablishments in California
United Artists